The Free Thought, also known as Vil'na dumka, Vilna Dumka and in ; is a weekly Ukrainian newspaper published in Australia since 1949. In addition to serving post-World War II immigrants and the second and third generations of those immigrants, the newspaper also caters to newer immigrants from post-Soviet Ukraine. It has sections in both Ukrainian and English.

History 

A large group of Ukrainian immigrants arrived in Australia in 1948, 1949, and 1950 with the assistance of two-year work contracts offered by the Australian government. This was the impetus for the creation of two Ukrainian-language newspapers in Australia, one of which was The Free Thought. Upon receiving the Federal Government's permission, the first edition was published on 10 July 1949. Since then, the newspaper has had a role in reporting on the establishment and development of Ukrainian Australian cultural and social life.

In the 1980s, The Free Thought helped establish the Ukrainian Studies Foundations in Australia Ltd. to support Ukrainian studies at the university level. In 1994, The Free Thought joined with the Ukrainian Studies Foundation to publish a history called the Almanac of Ukrainian Life in Australia, . Another book was published in 2001, this time with the Ukrainian Heritage Society in Australia, containing over 2000 biographies of Ukrainian Australians, titled Ukrainians in Australia: an Encyclopedic Guide .

Organization 

The founder, owner, and editor was Wolodymyr Shumsky (Szumskyj), who edited more than 3000 editions of the newspaper since its launch in 1949. An active member of the Ukrainian Australian community, Shumsky was awarded a Medal of the Order of Australia in 2009 for "service to the Ukrainian community through cultural, educational and literary contributions".

Over the years, contributors to Vilna Dumka have included Dmytro Nytczenko, Bohdan Podolianko, and Wasyl Onufrienko.

References

Bibliography

External links 

 catalogue entry for Vil'na Dumka from the National Library of Australia
 The Free Thought product details on www.wrapaway.com.au

1949 establishments in Australia
Publications established in 1949
Newspapers published in Sydney
Ukrainian diaspora in Australia
Ukrainian publishers (people)
Non-English-language newspapers published in Australia
European-Australian culture
Ukrainian-language newspapers